Parry Sound/Derbyshire Island Water Aerodrome, formerly , is an airport  southwest of Parry Sound, Ontario, Canada.

See also
 List of airports in the Parry Sound area

References

Defunct seaplane bases in Ontario